Joeri Stallaert (born 25 January 1991 in Denderbelle) is a Belgian former professional cyclist, who rode professionally between 2011 and 2020 for five different teams.

Major results

2009
 1st Gent–Menen
 1st Ronde van Vlaanderen Junioren
 3rd Omloop Mandel-Leie-Schelde Juniors
2010
 3rd Dwars door de Antwerpse Kempen
 7th Paris–Tours Espoirs
2011
 2nd Nationale Sluitingsprijs
 4th Grote Prijs Stad Geel
 8th Dwars door de Antwerpse Kempen
 9th Kampioenschap van Vlaanderen
 10th De Vlaamse Pijl
2012
 1st Antwerpse Havenpijl
 4th Omloop van het Houtland
 7th Münsterland Giro
 8th De Kustpijl
 9th Schaal Sels
2014
 4th Nationale Sluitingsprijs
 4th Kernen Omloop Echt-Susteren
 5th Ronde Pévéloise
 7th Kampioenschap van Vlaanderen
 7th Top Compétition
 7th Grand Prix de la ville de Pérenchies
 8th De Kustpijl
 8th Grand Prix Pino Cerami
 9th Grand Prix Criquielion
 10th Handzame Classic
2015
 2nd Omloop van het Waasland
 4th De Kustpijl
 5th Antwerpse Havenpijl
 6th Grote Prijs Stad Zottegem
 7th Handzame Classic
 9th Grand Prix Criquielion
 10th Dwars door de Vlaamse Ardennen
 10th Schaal Sels
2016
 2nd Ronde van Overijssel
 4th Dwars door de Vlaamse Ardennen
 5th Gooikse Pijl
 8th Schaal Sels
 9th Grote Prijs Jef Scherens
 9th De Kustpijl
 9th Kampioenschap van Vlaanderen
 10th Grote Prijs Stad Sint-Niklaas
2017
 1st Stage 1 Kreiz Breizh Elites
 2nd Overall Paris–Arras Tour
 2nd Internationale Wielertrofee Jong Maar Moedig
 2nd Grote Prijs Stad Zottegem
 3rd Nokere Koerse
 3rd Heistse Pijl
 4th Gooikse Pijl
 5th Grote Prijs Jef Scherens
 6th Ronde van Limburg
 8th Omloop van het Houtland
 10th Halle–Ingooigem
2018
 7th Poreč Trophy
 9th Omloop Mandel-Leie-Schelde
2019
 4th Grote Prijs Stad Zottegem
 7th Gooikse Pijl

References

External links

1991 births
Living people
Belgian male cyclists
People from Lebbeke
Cyclists from East Flanders